The Professional Footballers' Association of Ireland Team of the Year (often called the PFAI Team of the Year, or simply the Team of the Year) is an annual award given to the group of eleven players voted by their fellow players as having performed the best over the season. There are two separate teams voted for; the League of Ireland Premier Division and a League of Ireland First Division.

Winners

2009
Source

Premier Division

First Division

2010
Source

Premier Division

First Division

2011
Source

Premier Division

First Division

2012
Source

Premier Division

First Division

2013
Source

Premier Division

First Division

2014
Source

Premier Division

First Division

2015
Source

Premier Division

First Division

2016
Source

Premier Division

First Division

2017
Source

Premier Division

First Division

2018
Source

Premier Division

First Division

2019
Source

Premier Division

First Division

2020

Premier Division

First Division

2021

Premier Division

First Division

2022

Premier Division

First Division

Notes

See also
PFAI Players' Player of the Year
PFAI Young Player of the Year

References

External links

2010s in Irish sport
Association football in Ireland
European football trophies and awards